The Instituto Superior de Engenharia de Coimbra (ISEC) is a higher education polytechnic institution of engineering, based in Coimbra, Portugal. It belongs to the Polytechnic Institute of Coimbra, although with a great level of administrative, financial, and pedagogic autonomy.

History
Its origins backs to the creation of the Industrial Institute of Coimbra (Instituto Industrial de Coimbra) created in September 1965 as a non-higher education institute of vocational education.

With the approval of decree "Decreto-Lei 830/74", of 31 December 1974, the Industrial Institute of Coimbra remodeled to what it is now known as Coimbra Institute of Engineering, (ISEC) "Instituto Superior de Engenharia Coimbra". According to that decree all superior institutes of engineering were of university level, they were allowed to award bachelors, masters and doctorates.
However, at the time ISEC only conferred bachelors in Civil Engineering, Electrical Engineering, Mechanical Engineering, Chemistry Engineering, with 8 semesters (4 years).

Its status was changed from university when it was integrated into the polytechnic subsector in 1988 through the decree "Decreto-Lei nº389/88", of 25 of October", and incorporated into the newly created Polytechnical Institute of Coimbra. It remodeled all courses to a 6 semesters (3 years) bacharelato degrees in several technical engineering specializations, until the late 1990s. In 1989 new courses were created, Computer Sciences Engineering and in 1991 Electromechanical Engineering was introduced. At this time new legal decrees were adopted by Portuguese State (Administrative Rule 413A/98 of 17 July 1998), and it started to award 3 + 2 licenciaturas bietápicas (bacharelato plus one or two extra years, conferring the licenciatura degree - a degree that had been awarded exclusively by the universities). In the mid-2000s ISEC adopted new more selective admission rules which were imposed to every Portuguese higher education institution by the State.

In 2006 Biological Engineering  was introduced already according to Bologna Process, awarding the degree of "licenciatura" bachelors (3 years). After 2006, with the approval of new legislation and the Bologna Process, ISEC, like any other polytechnic or university institution of Portugal, is legally able to provide a first 3-year study cycle, known as licenciatura plus a second 2-year cycle which confer the master's degree (in some cases this higher degree may be awarded in cooperation with a partner university) . This late changes were gradually developed, the curricula of many courses were deeply changed, other courses were discontinued (like now defunct ISEC's polytechnic degree in chemical engineering). In 2007 Biomedical Engineering and Industrial Management Engineering were introduced. Nowadays nine bachelors according to the Declaration of Bologna are fully functional.

Library

The Institute's library occupies the main floor of the Interdisciplinary Building. It provides a main reading room with seating capacity for 230 individuals. In addition, several group study rooms are available for 30 users. The library also provides access to Hemerotheca archives containing 100 volumes of specialized published periodicals organized in alphabetical order of the work's title.

Facts and figures
Degree types awarded: bachelor degree and masters' degree in engineering-related subjects
ISEC has night classes for workers which is a unique characteristic of most polytechnic institutions in Portugal

Activities

Feira de Engenharia de Coimbra (FENGE) is an initiative organized by the AEISEC (Students' Association of ISEC). The objective is to provide an opportunity to share experiences between companies in the fields of engineering and the student community.

In most recent times ISEC-DEIS (Computer Science Department) has organised another leading activity called HandsOn@Deis, it brings companies of the Information Technology sector in direct contact with students, creating workshops and activities.

Students' Association
 
The Student Association at ISEC was created in 1979 and aims to provide a unified voice for ISEC students, as well as general information, culture, sports and leisure. Since their founding, they have grown as one of the most valued Associations on a national scale in what regards its educational policies. They are dedicated to providing students with programmes and events. Throughout their existence they have accommodated two study areas for students, two snack bars and a photocopy processing centre, several sport and recreation activities, get-togethers, important events such as academic lectures, musical events, photography and computer fairs, an engineering fair which earned reputation at the national level, a student support and career opportunities office and a support service for exchange students under the Socrates/Erasmus/Leonardo programmes.

Programs of study 
 Bioengineering
 Civil Engineering
 Computer Science
 Computer Science - European Course (ERASMUS)
 Electrical Engineering
 Industrial Engineering and Management
 Mechanical Engineering
 Electromechanical Engineering
 Biomedical Engineering - specialization in Bioelectronics

See also
List of colleges and universities in Portugal
Higher education in Portugal

References

Polytechnic Institute of Coimbra